Alexander William Frederick Fraser, 19th Lord Saltoun  (8 August 1851 – 19 June 1933), a Scottish representative peer, was the son of Alexander Fraser, 18th Lord Saltoun.

On 7 July 1885, he married Mary Helena Grattan-Bellew and they had five children:

Alexander Arthur Fraser, 20th Lord Saltoun (1886–1979)
Rear-Admiral Hon. George Fraser, RN (born 1887)
Lieutenant Hon. Simon Fraser, Gordon Highlanders (born 1888, killed in action 29 October 1914).
Brigadier Hon. William Fraser (1890–1964)
Hon. Mary Alexandra Fraser (born 1891), married:
(1) Lieutenant-Commander John Codrington (died November 1918)
(2) Major Arthur Ramsay

References

1851 births
1933 deaths
Clan Fraser
Companions of the Order of St Michael and St George
Scottish representative peers
Lords Saltoun